William Frank Mahoney (February 22, 1856 – December 27, 1904) was a U.S. Representative from Illinois.

Born in Chicago, Illinois, Mahoney was educated in the public schools of Chicago. He engaged in mercantile pursuits in 1876. He served as alderman in the Chicago City Council from 1884 to 1887 and again from 1890 to 1896.

Mahoney was elected as a Democrat to the Fifty-seventh and Fifty-eighth Congresses and served from March 4, 1901, until his death in Chicago, Illinois, December 27, 1904.

He was interred in Calvary Cemetery in Evanston, Illinois.

See also
List of United States Congress members who died in office (1900–49)

References

 William F. Mahoney, late a representative from Illinois, Memorial addresses delivered in the House of Representatives and Senate frontispiece 1905

1856 births
1904 deaths
Politicians from Chicago
Democratic Party members of the United States House of Representatives from Illinois
Chicago City Council members
19th-century American politicians
Burials at Calvary Cemetery (Evanston, Illinois)